Bob and Mike Bryan were the defending champions, but chose not to participate this year.

Nikola Mektić and Franko Škugor won the title, defeating Robin Haase and Wesley Koolhof in the final, 6–7(3–7), 7–6(7–3), [11–9].

Seeds

Draw

Finals

Top half

Bottom half

References

External Links
 Main draw

Doubles